EIKON International is located in Montgomery, Alabama, and makes interurban cars, trolley cars and streetcars.  EIKON also restores and manufactures other types of rail cars, including streetcars. EIKON emerged in 2008 as Edwards Rail Car Company ceased production of railcars at the Montgomery location.

Current operations
In production are several railbuses to be sent to Peru for operation, patterned after original Edwards designs dating from the mid-1920s. The propulsion system for these cars uses a diesel-hydraulic design after joint engineering with Parker Hannifin and Cummins.

Peter Witt trolley #754 was restored for McKinney Avenue Transit Authority, as well as an original Edwards Model 10 for a private collector.

See also
Doodlebug
Streetcar

References

External links
 EIKON International, LLC
 Machu Picchu Train Website
 MATA

Rolling stock manufacturers of the United States
Railway service companies of the United States
Companies based in Montgomery, Alabama